The 2021 Southern Utah Thunderbirds football team represented Southern Utah University in the 2021 NCAA Division I FCS football season. They were led by sixth-year head coach Demario Warren and played their home games at Eccles Coliseum in Cedar City, Utah. They played their final season as a member of the Big Sky Conference, as they would depart for the Western Athletic Conference for the 2022 season.

Previous season

The Thunderbirds finished the 2020–21 season 1–5 to finish in seventh place.

Preseason

Polls
On July 26, 2021, during the virtual Big Sky Kickoff, the Thundebirds were predicted to finish eleventh in the Big Sky by both the coaches and media.

Preseason All–Big Sky team
The Thunderbirds had one player selected to the preseason all-Big Sky team.

Defense

La'akea Kaho'ohanohano-Davis – OL

Schedule

Game summaries

at San Jose State

at No. 25 (FBS) Arizona State

vs. Tarleton State

No. 6 Eastern Washington

Portland State

at Sacramento State

at Northern Arizona

Northern Colorado

at No. 11 Montana

at Idaho

Weber State

References

Southern Utah
Southern Utah Thunderbirds football seasons
Southern Utah Thunderbirds football